Youngers is a British comedy drama series created by Benjamin Kuffuor and Levi David Addai. It began airing on E4 on 20 March 2013. It is produced by Big Talk Productions.
The series has been picked up for international distribution by BBC Worldwide.

Premise
The series follows a group of south-east London teenagers aiming to become the next big thing on the urban music scene. It opens with Yemi (Ade Oyefeso) and Jay (Calvin Demba) on their way to school to collect their GCSE results. After collecting the results, Yemi finds out he has had straight A's, whilst Jay receives poor grades. Jay then receives a leaflet about a local music competition, and pays to go and perform at the competition. At the reception, a grumpy receptionist soon enlists them as 'youngers', on the performers sheet. They deliver an excellent performance, and slowly, rise to the top of the music charts. Yemi adds his secret-crush Davina to their group, who loves Jay. Getting managed by their good friend Ash, the Youngers slowly make their way to the top of the music charts in London, however, the higher they get, more problems emerge. Slowly, the group starts to fade away, as Jay and Davina get into a secret relationship to hide things from Yemi.

Production and cast
The series was greenlit for an eight episode order in August 2012. Producer Luke Alkin said in an interview that the series is inspired by the mainstream success of British urban music, citing artists such as Dizzee Rascal and Tinie Tempah as models for the lead characters of Jay and Yemi. Well respected UK composer Aiden Hogarth aka S.K.I.T.Z Beatz was brought in to create the original soundtrack.

There was an open casting call in early 2012 for the lead roles of Jay and Yemi, where over 350 actors were seen. To audition, it was required that the actors have some rap or musical background. After Ade Oyefeso and Calvin Demba were added to the cast, the series was filmed between September and November in Peckham. The final cast was made up of predominantly new talent including YouTube act and Brit School graduates Mandem on the Wall.

Broadcast

The series was declared a 'hit' after a 450,000 viewer turn out for the first episode. E4 have said, "Youngers has been a huge success, but we have to let time tell the tale from here, as the following episodes will have to be even better for it to continue." On 27 June 2013 it was announced by Morgan Jeffery on the Digital Spy Website that E4 have ordered a second series for Youngers. It was broadcast some in June 2014 with 8 new episodes with Calvin Demba, Ade Oyefeso and Shavani Seth returning, also YouTube sensation Mandem on the Wall.

Episodes

Season 1

Season 2

References

External links

What's Good? Online | Interview with Shavani Seth

2013 British television series debuts
2014 British television series endings
English-language television shows
Television shows set in London
British comedy-drama television shows
Television series about teenagers
Television series by Big Talk Productions
Television series by ITV Studios